Belle Vue means "beautiful view" in French. It may refer to:

Place names
Bells Vue, Allerdale, a location in Cumbria, England
Belle Vue, Cumbria, a district of Carlisle, England
Belle Vue, County Durham, a locality in the TS postcode area of Hartlepool, England
Belle Vue Harel, a village in Rivière du Rempart District, Mauritius
Belle Vue, Manchester, an area of Manchester, Greater Manchester, England
Belle Vue, Shrewsbury, a suburb of Shrewsbury, Shropshire, England
Belle Vue, South Yorkshire, a locality within Doncaster, England
Belle Vue, Torbeck, Haiti, a village in the Torbeck commune of Haiti
Belle Vue, Bradford, a district of Bradford, England
Belle Vue, Wakefield, West Yorkshire, England

Sporting
Belle Vue (Doncaster), an association football ground in Doncaster, England, former home of Doncaster Rovers
Belle Vue Stadium a greyhound racing and speedway stadium in Manchester, England
Belle Vue speedway, a speedway stadium in Manchester, England.
Belle Vue Aces, a motorcycle speedway team based in Manchester.
Belle Vue Colts, a junior motorcycle speedway team linked to the Belle Vue Aces
Belle Vue (Rhyl), an association football stadium in Rhyl, Wales, used by Rhyl F.C.
Belle Vue (Wakefield), a rugby league stadium in Wakefield, England, home of Wakefield Trinity

Other
Belle Vue (Bellevue, Tennessee), a mansion on the US National Register of Historic Places
Belle Vue Airfield, an airfield in north Devon, England
Belle-Vue Brewery, a lambic brewery in Belgium
Belle Vue Girls' Academy, a secondary school in Bradford, West Yorkshire, England
Belle Vue House, an historical house located at 92 Cheyne Walk, Chelsea, London
Belle Vue (palace), a palace designed by Zygmunt Gorgolewski
Belle Vue railway station, a railway station serving Belle Vue, Manchester, England
Belle Vue railway station, Isle of Man a railway station serving Port Lewaigue and Port-e-Vullen on the Isle of Man
Belle Vue Zoological Gardens, a former zoo, gardens and amusement park in Manchester, England
Belle Vue, Alco-pop Band, West Yorkshire
Belle Vue (Amherstburg), a historic house in Essex County, Canada

See also
Belleview (disambiguation)
Bellevue (disambiguation)